Marine Fighter Squadron 541 (VMF-541) was a reserve fighter squadron of the United States Marine Corps. Originally commissioned during World War II as a night fighter unit flying the F6F-5N Hellcat, the squadron participated in combat action over Peleliu and while supporting the liberation of the Philippines in 1944–45.  During the war, VMF(N)-541 was credited with downing 23 Japanese aircraft. Following the war, the squadron participated in the occupation of Northern China until returning to the States to be decommissioned on April 20, 1946.  The squadron was reactivated sometime after the war in the Marine Corps Reserve until being decommissioned again in the early 1960s.

History

Formation, training and movement overseas
Marine Night Fighter Squadron 541 (VMF(N)-541) was commissioned on February 15, 1944, at Marine Corps Air Station Cherry Point, North Carolina with Maj Peter Lambrecht serving as the first commanding officer. On March 14, the squadron commenced training for aerial combat at night and in poor weather and low visibility. Training was complete on July 17 and on July 20 the squadron's ground echelon departed for the West Coast. The aircraft departed MCAS Cherry Point on July 22 with all elements of the squadron having arrived in California by July 26.

Peleliu
On September 24, 1944, eight fighters from VMF(N)-541, flying in from Emirau, landed on Peleliu escorted by an R5C flown by MajGen James T. Moore.  On the evening of October 31, Maj Norman Mitchell from VMF(N)-541 became the only Marine to shoot down a Japanese aircraft in the Palaus when he intercepted an Aichi E13A JAKE Observation seaplane.   During the squadron's time on Peleliu it flew 287 night-bombing missions and 461 nighttime Combat air patrols.  Three F6F Hellcats were lost during this time with all three pilots surviving the incidents.  At the end of November, a request was received from US Army forces in the Philippines for a land-based night fighter squadron flying F6Fs because the local P-61 Black Widows were being outclassed by Japanese aircraft. The squadron was alerted to move on November 28 and twelve VMF(N)-541 night fighters departed Peleliu on December 3, 1944, flying 602 miles west to Tacloban Airfield.

Philippines
Upon landing at Tacloban, the squadron was assigned to the 308th Bombardment Wing and began flying the evening they arrived.  VMF(N)-541 assumed facilities that had been left by the 421st Night Fighter Squadron.  Initial tasking for the squadron did not involve maintaining a continuous overhead presence at night as had been expected.  Instead, the squadron was asked to conduct combat patrols at dawn and dusk when leadership viewed itself as most vulnerable. The squadron netted its first victory in the Philippines on December 5 when Second Lieutenant Rodney Montgomery Jr. downed a Nakajima Ki-43 OSCAR.  On the morning of December 12, three fighters from VMF(N)-541 were flying off of the west coast of Leyte when they were vectored toward a large formation of thirty-three Japanese aircraft split into five separate groups heading towards the US Fleet in Ormoc Bay.  The squadron's fighters immediately engaged and were credited with downing 12 Japanese aircraft at the end of the fighting.  This marked the largest one-day tally for the squadron during the war.

Beginning on December 15, the squadron provided aerial protection for the US landing at Mindoro. Dawn/dusk patrols and providing protection to allied convoys in the area continued until January 3, 1945, when a Japanese aircraft was able to strafe the runway at Tacloban multiple times.  From that point forward, VMF(N)-541 was tasked with continuous nighttime combat air patrols.  While in the Philippines, the squadron flew 312 sorties equaling 924 combat hours. It was credited with downing 20 Japanese aircraft and destroying another five more on the ground.  VMF(N)-541 departed the Philippines headed back to Peleliu on January 11, 1945.  For actions in support of the United States Army in the Philippines, the squadron became the only Marine Aviation unit to be awarded the United States Army's Distinguished Unit Citation.

Remainder of the war and occupation duty
VMF(N)-541 continued flying combat air patrols from Peleliu.  On March 23, 1945, a six-plane detachment and maintenance personnel were sent to Falalop Airfield to assist with local air interdiction after having been trained in nighttime dive bombing.  The squadron was operating from both Peleliu and Falalop when the Japanese surrendered. The Falalop detachment returned to Peleliu on August 28 in anticipation of follow-on movement of the squadron.  In September 1945 the squadron departed Peleliu for China.  AFter a two-week stint on Okinawa, the advanced flight echelon arrived at Nanyuan Airfield on October 8 with all elements of the squadron arriving by November 5.  While in China the squadron was responsible for flying combat air patrols and reconnaissance flights.  VMF(N)-541 returned to the United States in 1946 and was decommissioned on April 30, 1946.

Reserve years
After the war the squadron was reactivated in the reserves and originally based at Naval Air Station Birmingham, Alabama.  On January 10, 1951, VMF-541 personnel were assigned to extended active duty as part of the call up of reserves in support of the Korean War mobilization.  On March 4, 1951, VMF(N)-541 was the first Marine Corps squadron to win the Pete Ross Safety Award, beating out 29 other Marine Corps squadrons.

See also
United States Marine Corps Aviation
List of United States Marine Corps aircraft squadrons
List of decommissioned United States Marine Corps aircraft squadrons

Citations

References
Bibliography

 

N
Inactive units of the United States Marine Corps